State Route 283 (SR 283) is a south-north state highway that runs in a wide arc in the northeastern part of the U.S. state of Georgia. Its route is located entirely within Hall County.

Route description
SR 283 begins at an intersection with SR 60 (Thompson Bridge Road) northwest of Gainesville. It heads northeast, crossing the Wahoo Creek arm of Lake Lanier. Then, the route curves to the northwest before curving back to the east. West of Clermont, it shares a brief concurrency with SR 52 (Dahlonega Highway). Farther to the east, in Clermont, SR 283 has an even shorter concurrency with SR 284 (Main Street). Just before leaving Clermont is an intersection with US 129/SR 11 (Cleveland Highway). SR 283 heads southeast until it reaches Skitts Mountain Road. There, it makes a right turn until it meets its northern terminus, a second intersection with SR 52 (Lula Road).

History

Major intersections

See also

References

External links

283
Transportation in Hall County, Georgia